Rayne is a village of about 2,300 residents in the Braintree district of Essex in the East of England.

It lies on the Roman road called Stane Street, about two miles (3 km) to the west of Braintree, which is the nearest town.

It used to be a more important settlement than Braintree in Norman times, although this has not been the case for a long time now.

Rayne has a playing field, a pub called The Swan, a village hall that overlooks the playing field, All Saints' church, a war memorial, a stream called Pod's Brook, and a small airfield. There are also the old manor house of Rayne Hall, and Old Hall; a previous Rectory. Rayne Hall was for a long time the home of the Capel family, who became Earls of Essex.  In mediaeval times, the Church was known for healing miracles: it was said that infertile women visiting the church were later able to conceive.  A number of the churchyard memorials are made of cast iron: these were manufactured at the former foundry in The Street at around the end of the nineteenth century using a common mould into which individual letters were inserted to spell out the details.

The church building consists of the Tudor tower, built in 1510, a Nave (an 1840 construction, replacing a Norman building from 1199 and said to be unsafe) and a Sanctuary and Vestry, added in 1914.  The earliest recorded Rector is Ralph de Fremingham, from 1260.

Further west along the main road ("The Street"), there are: an Indian restaurant, another pub, the Welsh Princess, the site of the former Rayne Iron foundry (redeveloped for housing and offices in 2009), the Post Office stores, and what was a pub called The Cock, now renovated and operating as a bar and restaurant called 47 The Street. The road leads to the town of Great Dunmow.

Station Road leads down to the former Rayne railway station, which is now the Rayne Station Centre of the Flitch Way Country Park, a linear park stretching along the former trackbed of the railway. This is also now National Cycle Network route No. 16.

On 12 July 2006, Rayne was named Essex Village of the Year, in a competition organised annually by Rural Community Council of Essex (RCCE) and sponsored by Calor. Rayne also won first, the regional, and then national, Calor Village of the Year Competition 2006/7 in the ITC Category.

Notable residents 

 Beans On Toast, Folk Singer 
Leeroy Thornhill, Musician

References

External links

 Rayne Parish Council

Villages in Essex
Braintree District